This is a list of Austrian Twenty20 International cricketers.

In April 2018, the ICC decided to grant full Twenty20 International (T20I) status to all its members. Therefore, all Twenty20 matches played between Austria and other ICC members after 1 January 2019 will have T20I status.

This list comprises all members of the Austria cricket team who have played at least one T20I match. It is initially arranged in the order in which each player won his first Twenty20 cap. Where more than one player won his first Twenty20 cap in the same match, those players are listed alphabetically by surname (according to the name format used by Cricinfo).

Austria played their first match with T20I status on 29 August 2019 against Romania during the 2019 Romania T20 Cup.

Key

List of players
Statistics are correct as of 31 July 2022.

Note: The following match includes one or more missing catchers in the Cricinfo scorecard and hence statistics (as of 1 September 2019):
 vs. Czech Republic (1 September 2019); 1 missing catcher

References 

Austria